Borja Ekiza Imaz (born 6 March 1988) is a Spanish professional footballer who plays as a centre-back for UDC Txantrea.

Club career

Athletic Bilbao
Born in Pamplona, Ekiza arrived at Athletic Bilbao's youth system at the age of 14, being eligible to represent the Basque through his Navarrese roots. He spent his first two senior seasons with CD Basconia, the club's third team.

Subsequently, Ekiza played with the reserves in Segunda División B, being sparingly used over two years. On 8 January 2011, after a string of injuries to the defensive sector in the first team awarded him with promotion to the main squad, he made his La Liga debut in a 1–1 away draw against Málaga CF, playing the full 90 minutes; he finished his first top-flight campaign established in the starting XI, beating competition from seasoned veterans Fernando Amorebieta, Aitor Ocio and Ustaritz and being booked only once.

Ekiza lost his starting spot to Aymeric Laporte and Carlos Gurpegui in 2013–14 due to repeated injuries, and only appeared once in the league during the season, 37 minutes in a 2–1 win at Real Valladolid. On 31 July 2014, he terminated his contract with the Lions and signed a two-year deal with fellow top-tier side SD Eibar hours later.

Later years
On 21 July 2017, Cypriot First Division club AC Omonia announced the signing of Ekiza from Ukraine's FC Zirka Kropyvnytskyi. Two years later, following a spell in the same country and league with Enosis Neon Paralimni FC, the 31-year-old announced his retirement from football.

In the summer of 2021, after two years of inactivity, Ekiza joined local amateurs UDC Txantrea alongside his former Athletic teammate (youth and senior) Adrien Goñi.

Club statistics

Honours
Athletic Bilbao
Copa del Rey runner-up: 2011–12
UEFA Europa League runner-up: 2011–12

References

External links

1988 births
Living people
Spanish footballers
Footballers from Pamplona
Association football defenders
La Liga players
Segunda División B players
Tercera División players
Tercera Federación players
CD Basconia footballers
Bilbao Athletic footballers
Athletic Bilbao footballers
SD Eibar footballers
Ukrainian Premier League players
FC Zirka Kropyvnytskyi players
Cypriot First Division players
AC Omonia players
Enosis Neon Paralimni FC players
Basque Country international footballers
Spanish expatriate footballers
Expatriate footballers in Ukraine
Expatriate footballers in Cyprus
Spanish expatriate sportspeople in Ukraine
Spanish expatriate sportspeople in Cyprus